County Road 913 (also known as Guvågveien / "the Guvåg road") is a  road in the municipality of Bø in Nordland County, Norway. It starts in the village of Rottåsen, where it branches off from County Road 820, and runs southeast to the head of Jørnfjorden and then continues along the east side of the fjord to the village of Guvåg on the shore of Eidsfjorden.

Municipal Road 914 (a.k.a. Further south, at Røsnes, Municipal Road 924 (a.k.a. Røsnesveien 'the Røsnes road', formerly also designated County Road 914) branches off to the southwest and runs  to Jektneset on the shore of Jørnfjorden.

References

External links
Statens vegvesen – trafikkmeldinger Fv913 (Traffic Information: County Road 913)

913
Bø, Nordland